Pia or PIA may refer to:

Places
 Pia, Pyrénées-Orientales, a French commune
 Pia, Iran, a village in Razavi Khorasan Province, Iran
 PIA Township, a Pakistan International Airlines staff township, Pakistan
 614 Pia, an asteroid

People
 Pia (given name), a feminine given name
 Pia (surname)
 Pia Pounds, stage name of Ugandan recording artist Tracy Kirabo (born 1996)
 Pia Ravenna, stage name of Finnish opera singer Hjördis Sophie Tilgmann (1894-1964)
 Piá (footballer, born 1982), full name João Batista Inácio, Brazilian football player
 Piá (footballer, born 1973), Brazilian football player
 Pia (powerlifter), a Paralympic powerlifter from Laos, see Powerlifting at the 2016 Summer Paralympics – Men's 49 kg

Science and technology
 para-Iodoamphetamine, a research chemical
 Peripheral Interface Adapter, an integrated circuit
 Pia mater, a layer of the meninges of the brain and spinal cord
 Purified isophthalic acid, an aromatic dicarboxylic acid
 Tacca leontopetaloides, a species of flowering plant also known as Pia

Aviation
 Pacific Island Aviation, a former airline headquartered in Saipan, Northern Mariana Islands
 Pakistan International Airlines (abbreviation and ICAO designator)
 Pearson International Airport, Toronto, Ontario, Canada
 General Wayne A. Downing Peoria International Airport (IATA code and FAA location identifier), Peoria, Illinois, US
 Peruvian International Airways, an international airline that operated from 1947 to 1949
 Plattsburgh International Airport, NY, US
Penang International Airport, Penang, Malaysia

Organisations
 Pasteur Institute of Algeria
 Philippine Information Agency, the main development communication arm of the government
 Pittsburgh Institute of Aeronautics, Pittsburgh, Pennsylvania, US
 Planning Institute Australia
 Princeton in Asia, a nonprofit organization 
 Printing Industries of America
 Private Internet Access, a virtual private network provider
 Puntland Intelligence Agency, Somalia
 Pakistan Airlines (PIA), Paki airline company

Law
 Proprietary information agreement or non-disclosure agreement
 Personal Information Agent, an individual authorized in dealings with third persons
 Post-indictment arraignment, US
 Primary Insurance Amount, in regards to benefits payable under Title II of the Social Security Act
 Personal Insolvency Arrangement, a statutory mechanism in Ireland

Other uses
 Baroudeurs de Pia XIII or Pia Donkeys, a rugby league club based in Pia, Pyrénées-Orientales, France
 Privacy Impact Assessment, used to identify and minimize the privacy risks of new projects or policies
 Papers from the Institute of Archaeology, an academic journal
 PIA F.C., a football club based in Karachi, Pakistan
 PIA Model Secondary School, a school in PIA Township, Pakistan
 PIA Planetarium (disambiguation), three planetariums in Pakistan
 Proto-Indo-Aryan language, a reconstructed language ancestral to the Indo-Aryan languages
 Pia (band), a Korean rock band
 Pia (horse), a Thoroughbred racehorse
 Pia Carry, a lifesaving technique
 Pia Film Festival, a Japanese film festival

See also
 Porta Pia, a gate in the Aurelian Walls of Rome, Italy
 Casina Pio IV or Villa Pia, Vatican City
 PIAS (disambiguation)